Uffington is the name of several places:
 England
Uffington, Lincolnshire
 Uffington and Barnack railway station
 Uffington Rural District
Uffington, Oxfordshire 
 Uffington railway station (Uffington Junction)
Uffington, Shropshire

United States
Uffington, West Virginia

See also
Uffington Castle, Oxfordshire
 Uffington House, Chester
Uffington White Horse, Oxfordshire
 William de Uffington (before 1288after 1315), English priest
Huffington